Polish invasion of Russia or Polish invasion of Rus may refer to

 Boleslaw I's intervention in the Kievan succession crisis, 1018 (the Kiev Expedition)
 Polish–Muscovite War (1605–18)
 Polish–Soviet War (1919–20)

See also
List of armed conflicts involving Poland against Russia